To Get to Heaven, First You Have to Die (Bihisht faqat baroi murdagon) is a 2006 Tajik film directed by Jamshed Usmonov.

Plot
Kamal, a young man, is trapped into a loveless marriage in a rural village. He moves to a big city to seek his fortune and falls in love with Vera, a beautiful woman who, alas, is married. However, having got involved with organised crime, he finds that her husband is one of the mafiosi for whom he works. He uses this to his advantage, seeing Vera more and more often.

Cast
 Khurshed Golibekov: Kamal
 Dinara Drukarova: Vera
 Maraf Pulodzoda: Vera's husband

Release
The film débuted at the 2006 Cannes Film Festival on 23 May. It was released properly in France on 4 October of the same year, as well as being released in Poland, Estonia, Serbia, Mexico, Argentina and Hong Kong.

International titles
 Original Tajik: Bihisht faqat baroi murdagon – Биҳишт фақат барои мурдагон
 English: To Get to Heaven, First You Have to Die
 German: Um in den Himmel zu kommen muss man zuerst sterben
 French: Pour aller au ciel, il faut mourir
 Spanish: Para llegar al cielo primero hay que morir

References

External links
 

2006 films
Tajikistani drama films
2000s crime drama films
Films directed by Jamshed Usmonov
Fictional Tajikistani people
Films set in Tajikistan
2006 drama films